Moustafa Zeidan Khalili (born 7 June 1998) is a Swedish professional footballer who plays as a midfielder for Malmö FF.

Club career
On 3 December 2019 Jönköpings Södra confirmed that Zeidan would join the club for the 2020 season, signing a two-year deal.

International career 
In December 2021, Zeidan was selected for the Swedish national team's January tour, which was to be played in Portugal. The tour was later canceled. He was later called up again in December 2022. He made his full international debut for Sweden on 9 January 2023, playing for 68 minutes in a friendly 2–0 win against Finland before being replaced by Bilal Hussein.

Personal life
Zeidan was born in Sweden and is of Palestinian descent. He is the cousin of the footballers Imad and Abdul Khalili.

Career statistics

International

References

1998 births
Living people
Sportspeople from Helsingborg
Swedish footballers
Sweden international footballers
Sweden youth international footballers
Swedish people of Palestinian descent
Högaborgs BK players
Swedish expatriate footballers
Expatriate footballers in England
Swedish expatriate sportspeople in England
Helsingborgs IF players
Syrianska FC players
IF Brommapojkarna players
IK Frej players
Jönköpings Södra IF players
IK Sirius Fotboll players
Malmö FF players
Allsvenskan players
Superettan players
Association football midfielders